Tony Lloyd Jamieson (born 16 March 1974, in Wellington, New Zealand) is a former international footballer for the Cook Islands, having played in four FIFA World Cup qualifying campaigns.

Career

Club
Jamieson started his career as a junior player in Wellington, New Zealand, playing for North Wellington AFC in 1981, aged seven.

Nikao Sokkattack and Rarotonga F.C.
At the age of 26 he became a player for the Cook Islands, his mother's birth country. He played in the Cooks for one-year and coached Tupapa Maraerenga F.C. before returning to Wellington to play for Wellington Diamond United.

North Wellington Diamond United
He played there for 5 years, until the age of 31. New Zealand football, is the second most improved football, after Australian, of the Oceanian zone.

Nadi FC
In 2005, he became a player of Nadi F.C. in the IDC, Inter-district Cup Tournament.

His greatest football accomplishments have been to receive the man of the match awards in the two biggest internationals of his career. One against Australia in 2000 and the other against New Zealand in 2004. In both games the Cook Islands lost 17–0 and 2–0 respectively.

International
Jamieson made his international debut for the Cook Islands in 2000. In 2010, Jamieson became infamous after sitting with the ball for over minute during a 2–0 defeat to Fiji.

Management career
In November 2011, Jamieson was appointed as technical director of the Cook Islands Football Association. In 2013 he formed Football Cook Islands, a group of passionate, long-term football supporters, players, qualified coaches and club officials, concerned about the way football is currently being managed by the national association CIFA. He was subsequently suspended by CIFA and banned from all football-related activities by the Oceania Football Confederation for five years for ethical breaches.

Career statistics

International

Statistics accurate as of match played 26 November 2011

References

1974 births
Living people
People from Rarotonga
Nadi F.C. players
Association football goalkeepers
Cook Islands international footballers
Cook Island footballers
Wellington United players
Wellington Olympic AFC players
Stop Out players
New Zealand expatriate sportspeople in Fiji
New Zealand sportspeople of Cook Island descent
Cook Island expatriate sportspeople in Fiji
North Wellington players
2000 OFC Nations Cup players